The 15th Grey Cup was played on November 26, 1927, before 13,676 fans at the Varsity Stadium at Toronto.

The Toronto Balmy Beach Beachers defeated the Hamilton Tigers 9–6.

External links
 
 

Grey Cup
Grey Cup, 15th
Grey Cup
1927 in Ontario
November 1927 sports events
1920s in Toronto